The women's marathon event at the 1986 Commonwealth Games was held in Edinburgh, Scotland on 1 August 1986. It was the first time that women contested the marathon at the Commonwealth Games.

Results

References

Marathon
1986
Comm
Comm
1986 Commonwealth Games